Liolaemus yarabamba is a species of lizard in the family Iguanidae or the family Liolaemidae. The species is endemic to Peru.

References

yarabamba
Lizards of South America
Reptiles of Peru
Endemic fauna of Peru
Reptiles described in 2021
Taxa named by Cristian Simón Abdala